Georgetown is the name of some places in the U.S. state of Georgia:

Georgetown, Chatham County, Georgia
Georgetown, Quitman County, Georgia

Populated places in Georgia (U.S. state)

nl:Georgetown (Georgia)